Francois Moolman (born 2 April 1951) is a South African cricketer. He played in one first-class match for Boland in 1980/81.

See also
 List of Boland representative cricketers

References

External links
 

1951 births
Living people
South African cricketers
Boland cricketers
Cricketers from Cape Town